Bandar Damansara Alif is a major township in the city of Johor Bahru, Johor, Malaysia. This township is located between Tampoi and Bandar Baru UDA.

Johor Bahru
Towns and suburbs in Johor Bahru District